Sunit Khatau was an Indian billionaire industrialist who served as chairman and managing director of the Khatau Fabrics Group. He was assassinated in Mumbai on 7 May 1994 for matters related to a dispute about a land sale.

In addition to his industrial activity, Khatau was the largest owner of racehorses in India. His horses won races including the 1981 Indian Derby, the Invitation Cup, the Bangalore Derby and the Calcutta Derby.

References

People murdered in Mumbai
Indian businesspeople in textiles
1994 deaths
1994 murders in India
Deaths by firearm in India
1990s in Mumbai